Summertown is an unincorporated community and census-designated place (CDP) in Lawrence County, Tennessee, United States. The population of Summertown was 866 at the 2010 census. The town has a ZIP Code of 38483. Some rural areas in neighboring Lewis and Maury counties also use a "Summertown" mailing address, but their population is not included in the Census figures.

Geography
Summertown is in northeastern Lawrence County and is bordered to the north by Lewis County and to the northeast by Maury County. Tennessee State Route 20 passes through the center of town, leading east  to U.S. Route 43 and northwest  to Hohenwald. US-43 leads south  to Lawrenceburg, the Lawrence county seat, and northeast  to Columbia.

The community is drained by the North and South Forks of Saw Creek, a west-flowing tributary of the Buffalo River, which in turn flows northwest to the Duck River shortly before that river's mouth at the Tennessee River.

Demographics

Education
Summertown is home to two public schools. Summertown Elementary School educates students from kindergarten through 6th grade, while Summertown High School educates students from 7th through 12th grade. They both have an eagle as their mascot. 

Summertown athletic programs have been historically competitive on the state level, with state championships in volleyball, tennis, golf, softball, and baseball.

Tornadoes
The Summertown area historical tornado activity is slightly above Tennessee state average. It is 108% greater than the overall U.S. average.

On May 18, 1995, an F-4 (max. wind speeds 207-260 mph) tornado a mile away from Summertown killed 3 people, injured 32 people and caused between $500,000 and $5,000,000 in damages.

On April 16, 1998, an F-5 (max. wind speeds 261-318 mph) tornado right on Highway 43 in Summertown killed 3 people, injured 36 people and caused $13 million in damages.

There have been several other tornadoes to come through Summertown but these are two of the worst.

Attractions and areas of interest
The following are located in or near Summertown:

 The Farm, an intentional community
 Plenty International, an environmental and human rights organization
 Stillhouse Hollow Falls State Natural Area, a Tennessee natural area
 Turtle Hill Sangha is located in Monterey, and is a community of the Nyingma school's Tibetan Buddhist students of Khenchen Palden Sherab Rinpoche
 Spiral Ridge Permaculture, A permaculture education and research center, nursery and design firm.
 Wheelin in the Country An Off-Road Four-Wheelin Park for rock and hill climbing
 McKamey Manor Haunted Attraction

References

Unincorporated communities in Tennessee
Unincorporated communities in Lawrence County, Tennessee
Census-designated places in Lawrence County, Tennessee
Census-designated places in Tennessee